Innocence & Instinct is the second studio album by American Christian rock band Red. It was released on February 10, 2009 through Essential Records and Sony Music. It was produced by Rob Graves.

The standard edition of the album contains 10 tracks. The first single "Fight Inside" was released on October 26, 2008. The single debuted at No. 1 on the R&R Christian Rock chart. The album's second single, "Never Be the Same", was released to Christian CHR soon thereafter. On December 12, the third single from the album, "Death of Me", was released to Active, Mainstream, and Alternative Rock stations. The band also released a deluxe edition which features four bonus tracks and a DVD. Some copies of the album contain the song "Forever" as track nine instead of "Out from Under". The track "Shadows" was co-written by Breaking Benjamin guitarist/vocalist Ben Burnley. The album debuted at No. 15 on the Billboard 200, selling 39,000 copies in its first week.

The Deluxe Edition of Innocence & Instinct went as high as No. 2 on iTunes Top Selling Rock Albums Chart and No. 5 on Top-Selling Albums overall.

For the album, an alternate reality game was orchestrated by the band members. Red fans went through hidden web pages and passwords until around the time the album itself was released, when the final page was revealed, which contained a video message from the band itself, nine "treasures" (including posters, videos, and an unreleased track), and a message telling the puzzle participants not to post the contents on the internet or share them.

Drums on the album were played by Joe Rickard, the band's touring drummer. Rickard was not an official member of Red when the album was released, but was made a permanent member later in 2009. Rickard departed from the band in late January 2014.

In an interview on The Daily Rock, Jasen Rauch talks about the band not wanting "Ordinary World" added to the album. He states that Red originally arranged it just for something to do live. He goes on to say that the label pushed for it to be added to the album.

The album was nominated for Best Rock or Rap Gospel Album in the 2010 Grammy Awards. It won for Best Rock Album at the 41st GMA Dove Awards in 2010.

As of 2011, the album has sold over 260,000 copies.

Track listing

Deluxe Edition DVD 
 "Making of Documentary"
 "Death of Me" (music video)
 "Behind the Scenes of Death of Me video"
 "Photo Gallery"

Japan Special Edition bonus videos 
 "Death of Me (Video)"
 "Breathe Into Me (Video)"
 "Already Over (Video)"

Personnel

Red
 Michael Barnes – lead vocals
 Anthony Armstrong – rhythm guitar, backing vocals
 Jasen Rauch – lead guitar
 Randy Armstrong – bass, piano, backing vocals
 Joe Rickard – drums, percussion

Additional musicians
Jack Jezioro – bass
Anthony LaMarchina – cello
John Allan Catching – cello
Kirsten Cassel – cello
Bernie Herms – composer, string arrangements
John Taylor – composer
Nick Rhodes – composer
Simon LeBon – composer
Warren Cuccurullo – composer
Travis Palmer – drums
Hunter Lamb – guitar technician
Bobby Shin – string engineer
Jim Grosjean – viola
Monisa Angell – viola
David Angell – violin
David Davidson – string arrangements, violin
Karen Winkelmann – violin
Pamela Sixfin – violin
Richard Marx – composer, vocals (background)

Artwork and design
Stephanie McBrayer – art direction, stylist
Tim Parker – art direction, design
Megan Thompson – hair stylist, make-up
Caleb Kuhl – photography

Production and recording
Rob Graves – audio production, composer, digital editing, engineer, piano, producer, programming
Ben Grosse – mixing
Paul Pavao – mixing assistant
Tom Baker – mastering
Heather Hetzler – A&R
Fred Paragano – digital editing, drum engineering, assistant engineering
Jason McArthur – composer, executive producer
Jason Fowler – management

References

External links 

Death of Me video (HD version)

2009 albums
Post-grunge albums by American artists
Red (American band) albums